The 2008 edition of the Singapore Cup soccer competition was officially known as the RHB Singapore Cup (due to sponsorship from RHB Bank). It was the 11th staging of the annual Singapore Cup tournament.

The competition began on 6 May 2008, with 12 S.League clubs and 4 invited foreign teams from Thailand (2 teams), Cambodia (1) and Brunei (1). The cup was a single-elimination tournament, with all sixteen teams playing from the first round. The first round involved one-off matches. Subsequent rounds involved ties of two legs.

The final (single-leg) was played on 28 November 2008, and SAFFC beat Woodlands Wellington 2–1, with the deciding goal scored by Kenji Arai in the first period of extra-time.

Teams

  Albirex Niigata (S)
 Balestier Khalsa
  Bangkok University
  Dalian Shide
  DPMM FC
 Geylang United
 Gombak United
 Home United FC
  Phnom Penh Empire
 Sengkang Punggol FC
 Singapore Armed Forces FC (SAFFC)
  Super Reds
 Tampines Rovers
  Tobacco Monopoly
 Woodlands Wellington FC
  Young Lions FC (FAS under-23 team)

Knockout stage

Bracket

First knockout round
The draw for the first knockout round was held on Friday, 5 April 2008 in Singapore.  The first round matches started on 6 May.

Quarter-finals

First Legs

Second Legs

Woodlands Wellington progressed after winning 4 – 2 on penalties

Young Lions progressed after winning 1 – 0 on aggregate

Tampines Rovers progressed after winning 2 – 1 on aggregate

SAFFC progressed after winning 4 – 1 on aggregate

Semifinals

First Legs

Second Legs

 Woodlands Wellington progressed after winning 4 – 3 on aggregate

 SAFFC progressed after winning 4-0 on aggregate

3rd-place Playoff

Final

Top scorers

See also

 Singapore Cup
 S.League
 Singapore League Cup
 Singapore Charity Shield
 Football Association of Singapore
 List of football clubs in Singapore

External links
 Official S.League website
 Football Association of Singapore website

2008
Cup
Singapore Cup